Aerocraft may refer to:
Aerocraft, alternative spelling of aircraft
Aero-Craft Aero-Coupe, an American, three-passenger aircraft introduced in 1928
Servoplant Aerocraft, a Romanian agricultural ultralight biplane
Timm Aerocraft 2AS, an American aircraft introduced in 1941